The Glitch Mob is an American electronic music trio from Los Angeles, California. It consists of edIT (Edward Ma), Boreta (Justin Boreta) and Ooah (Josh Mayer). Chris Martins of LA Weekly noted that they "have undoubtedly found the largest audience of any L.A. beat scene artist yet."

History
The Glitch Mob, originally a four-piece including Kraddy, was formed within the burgeoning Los Angeles bass-driven 'beat' scene. The group made a name for themselves playing live performances, choosing to perform with laptops and MIDI controllers like the Lemur. They won fans through showcasing their chosen technology during solo performances, and after gaining attention in Los Angeles and San Francisco, the group eventually toured more widely along the West Coast and then to various festivals worldwide. After citing "creative differences," founding member Kraddy left the group in 2009.

The Glitch Mob's first album Drink the Sea peaked at number 57 on the CMJ Top 200 Chart for College Radio. The album's debut led Electronic Musician to run a cover story on the trio. Their single "Drive It Like You Stole It" was number 2 on XLR8R's Top Downloads of 2010 list. Their single "Warrior Concerto" was used in the official trailer for The Crew, and was written specifically for the FIAT 500 campaign to launch in the US. The sophomore Glitch Mob album Love Death Immortality debuted at number 1 on the Billboard Dance/Electronic Songs chart and at number 13 on the Billboard 200. Their remix for "Seven Nation Army" by The White Stripes was featured in the trailer for the 2013 film G.I. Joe: Retaliation, as well as the trailer for the World War I first-person shooter, Battlefield 1. Their song "Skullclub" was featured in an advert for Amazon Echo.

Touring
During their 2014 tour The Glitch Mob performed with a new musical element they called "The Blade." Built by movie set designers, it is a customized, painted set piece that houses both lights and instruments. In an interview with Sound of Boston Josh Mayer explained, "It really represents who we are and what we’re trying to say, and it’s just a functional thing that lets us play our music the way we want to play our music."

Discography

Albums

Studio albums
 Drink the Sea (2010)
 Love Death Immortality (2014) 
 See Without Eyes (2018)
 Ctrl Alt Reality (2022)

Remix albums
 Drink the Sea - The Remixes (2011)
 Love Death Immortality Remixes (2015)
 Revisions (2021)

Extended plays
We Can Make the World Stop (2011)
Piece of the Indestructible (2015)
Chemicals (2020)

Singles
 "Episode 8" (featuring D-Styles) (2009)
 "Black Aura" (featuring Theophilus London) (2009)
 "Beyond Monday" (2010)
 "Drive It Like You Stole It" (2010)
 "Warrior Concerto" (2011)
 "We Can Make the World Stop" (2011)
 "Can't Kill Us" (2013)
 "Better Hide, Better Run" (featuring Mark Johns) (2015)
 "How Could This Be Wrong" (featuring Tula) (2018)
 "Take Me With You" (featuring Arama) (2018)
 "I Could Be Anything" (featuring Elohim) (2018)
 "Go Light" (2018)
 "Rise" (featuring Mako and The Word Alive) (2018)
 "System Bleed" (with Lick) (2019)
 "Lazer Vision" (with Zeke Beats) (2019)
 "Momentary Lapse" (with 1788-L) (2019)

Mixtapes
 Local Area Network (2008)
 Crush Mode (2009)
 Drink the Sea Part II: The Mixtape (2010)
 More Voltage (2011)
 Do Lab Mix 2016 (2016)

Remixes
 Matty G – "West Coast Rocks" (2008)
 Evil Nine – "All the Cash" (2008)
 Coheed and Cambria – "Feathers" (2008)
 STS9 – "Beyond Right Now" (2008)
 TV on the Radio – "Red Dress" (2009)
 Nalepa – "Monday" (2009)
 Linkin Park – "Waiting for the End" (2010)
 Krazy Baldhead – "The 4th Movement" (2010)
 Daft Punk – "Derezzed" (2011)
 The White Stripes – "Seven Nation Army" (2011)
 Bassnectar – "Heads Up" (2012)
 The Prodigy – "Breathe" (2012)
 Metallica – "Lords of Summer" (2015)
 Ray Lynch – "Celestial Soda Pop" (Boreta Remix) (2015)
 Illenium – "Crawl Outta Love" (2018)
 Odesza featuring Sasha Sloan – "Falls" (2018)

Music videos
 "Beyond Monday" (2010)
 "Between Two Points" (2011)
 "We Can Make the World Stop" (2011)
 "Can't Kill Us" (2013)
 "Love Death Immortality" (Album, 2014)
 "See Without Eyes" (Album, 2018)
 "Drink the Sea" (Album, Songs:2010, Visual:2020)

References

External links
 
 Glass Air Records

American electronic musicians
Intelligent dance musicians
Musical groups established in 2006
2006 establishments in California
Ableton Live users
Musical groups from Los Angeles